Poptún Airport  is an airport serving the town of Poptún in Guatemala.

The runway is within the town.

See also
 
 
 Transport in Guatemala
 List of airports in Guatemala

References

External links
 OpenStreetMap - Poptún
 OurAirports - Poptún
 Poptún
 

Airports in Guatemala
Petén Department